Claudelle Deckert (born Claudia Deckert, 1974) is a German actress.

She is part of the main cast of the German soap opera Unter uns since 2001 with a two-year break between 2006 und 2008. In 2013, she appeared on season 7 of the German reality show Ich bin ein Star – Holt mich hier raus! (German version of I'm a Celebrity...Get Me Out of Here!), where she finished third. She also appeared in the German edition of Playboy in the February 2013 issue.

Deckert has a daughter, Romy, with Düsseldorf-based photographer Tom Lemke (d. 2017).

Filmography

Television

Reality TV

References

External links

1974 births
German television actresses
Living people
Actors from Düsseldorf
Ich bin ein Star – Holt mich hier raus! participants